Ronald L. Dapo (born May 8, 1952) is an American film and television actor. He is known for playing Flip Rose in the American sitcom television series Room for One More.

Life and career 
Dapo was born in Plattsburgh, New York. At the age of five, he and his family had moved to Pontiac, Michigan, then to California. While Dapo was on a bus, he met his agent, Lola Moore, while Dapo's mother was showing pictures of her children, he was asked if "he would like to audition". With his first try being successful, Dapo was cast in Jack Webb's 1959 film -30-. He was later signed to a contract with Warner Bros., for which Dapo had freelanced on numerous studios. Dapo also guest-starred on television programs including The Fugitive, Wagon Train, The Munsters, Cheyenne, The Sheriff of Cochise and The Lucy Show. He also appeared in the 1960 film Ocean's 11 and the 1962 film The Music Man.

Later in his career, Dapo starred in the ABC television series Room for One More, where he played Flip Rose. He also guest-starred in three episodes of the television series The Andy Griffith Show, where Dapo played Arnold Winkler. While he was on the set of The Andy Griffith Show, the directors of the program gave him a few takes for Dapo to work himself onto the role. In 1964, he was later cast in the situation comedy television series The New Phil Silvers Show, where he played Andy. At the age of 14, Dapo retired his film and television career.

After retiring, Dapo spent his life as a touring musician. He also ran a printing press and a steel frame, later retiring at the age of 60. He resided in Denver, Colorado, living with his wife.

References

External links 

Rotten Tomatoes profile

1952 births
Living people
People from Plattsburgh, New York
Male actors from New York (state)
American male film actors
American male television actors
20th-century American male actors